Bartosz Bielenia (born 15 May 1992) is a Polish film and stage actor.

Education 
In 2016, Bielenia graduated from  AST National Academy of Theatre Arts in Kraków.

Career 
He made his debut in 1999 at the Aleksander Wegierko  Dramatic Theater in Białystok as the title character in the play 'The Little Prince'. 

From 2013 he played in Bagatela Theatre in Krakow, where he debuted with the role of the consumptive seventeen-year-old Ippolit Terentyev in Dostoyevsky's The Idiot. In the years 2014–2017 he performed at the Helena Modrzejewska National Stary Theater in Kraków. Since 2018 he has been performing in the New Theater in Warsaw. In 2019, he was awarded the Zbigniew Cybulski Award. In 2020, he received the Shooting Star Award for best young European actor, and the European Film Award for best actor.

In 2021, he played Sebastian in the Netflix crime-thriller Prime Time.

Filmography

Film

Television

Awards 
 2016: Międzynarodowy Festiwal Kina Niezależnego „Off Camera” in Krakowie – Special Mention for an actor in the Polish Feature Film Competition for the film  Na granicy
 2016: Koszaliński Festiwal Debiutów Filmowych „Młodzi i Film” – nagroda za odkrycie aktorskie za „wyjątkową obecność w filmie, bogate środki wyrazu. Za moc i wiarygodność” za film Na granicy
 2019: Zbigniew Cybulski Award
 2020: Forbes 30 under 30 recognition
 2020: Shooting Star Award

References

External links
 Biography @ Culture.PL
 Biography - European Film Promotion
 Corpus Christi actor Bartosz Bielenia joins thespian A-list after being awarded European Shooting Stars 2020
 Biography - Nowy Teatr
 DAS IMPERIUM TALENT AGENCY
 ‘Corpus Christi’s Mateusz Pacewicz And Bartosz Bielenia Talk How A Polish Film About Fake Priesthood Became A Universal Story
  Bartosz Bielenia 
 Bartosz Bielenia named European Shooting Star 2020
 Bartosz Bielenia - Polish Film festival LA
 Bartosz Bielenia  - Actor "When you scratch a bit under the surface of the Oscars you find something else…" cineuropa
 Bartosz Bielenia  e-TALENTA
 AFI Fest ’19 Interview: Bartosz Bielenia and Jan Komasa on Finding the Faith Within Themselves to Make “Corpus Christi”

1992 births
Living people
Polish male film actors
Polish male stage actors
21st-century Polish male actors
Actors from Białystok
Artists from Białystok